Medythia is a genus of beetles belonging to the family Chrysomelidae.

The species of this genus are found in Africa and Southeastern Asia.

Species:

Medythia quaterna 
Medythia suturalis

References

Galerucinae
Chrysomelidae genera
Taxa named by Martin Jacoby